Braggadocio may refer to:

Braggadocchio, a fictional character in the epic poem The Faerie Queene
A braggart or empty boasting
Braggadocio (rap), a type of rapping
Braggadocio (typeface), a typeface
Braggadocio, Missouri, a community